The 2008–09 VfL Bochum season was the 71st season in club history.

The team finished in 14th place in the Bundesliga league, after playing 34 league matches, of which they only won seven matches.

Review and events

Matches

Legend

Bundesliga

DFB-Pokal

Squad

Squad and statistics

Squad, appearances and goals scored

Transfers

Summer

In:

Out:

Winter

In:

Out:

VfL Bochum II

Sources

External links
 2008–09 VfL Bochum season at Weltfussball.de 
 2008–09 VfL Bochum season at kicker.de 
 2008–09 VfL Bochum season at Fussballdaten.de 

Bochum
VfL Bochum seasons